Dashlujeh may refer to:
 Dashlujeh, Ardabil
 Dashlujeh, East Azerbaijan
 Dashlujeh, Zanjan